Admiral Sir Bartholomew Samuel Rowley (10 June 1764 – 7 October 1811) was a British naval officer who served during the American, French Revolutionary and Napoleonic Wars.

Biography
He was second son of Vice-Admiral Sir Joshua Rowley, and was a member of a notable naval dynasty; his grandfather was Admiral of the Fleet Sir William Rowley, while his younger brother was Admiral Sir Charles Rowley, and his cousins included Admiral Sir Josias Rowley, Rear-Admiral Samuel Campbell Rowley, Vice-Admiral Sir Joshua Ricketts Rowley, and Admiral of the Fleet Sir George Martin. His sister Philadelphia Rowley was married to Admiral Sir Charles Cotton.

Rowley attended Harrow School from 1775, and then entered in the Navy. By 1780 was serving as a lieutenant aboard his father's flagship, the 74-gun . On 31 January 1781 he was made post (before his 17th birthday!) in order to command the 28-gun sixth-rate frigate . On 20 April 1781 Resource captured the 20-gun French frigate Licorne in an action lasting 1½ hours. She proved to be the former , which had been captured on 4 September 1780 by a French frigate and two ships of the line off Tortuga.

In October 1782 Rowley took command of the fifth-rate 32-gun frigate , where he served until August 1783. However, with the end of the American Revolutionary War in September 1783, Rowley found himself, like many other naval officers, unemployed on half-pay for nearly a decade. By the time of the outbreak of the French Revolutionary War in February 1793 Rowley was back at sea in command of the 32-gun frigate , serving in the Jamaica Squadron, under the command of Commodore John Ford. On 16 April 1793 Penelope captured the French aviso Le Goéland, commanded by lieutenant de vaisseau Leissègues de Pennenyum, en route from Cap-Français to Jérémie.

In late 1793 Ford took advantage of the Haitian Revolution to occupy several ports in the French colony of Saint-Domingue (now Haiti). On 20 November 1793 Penelope sailed from Môle-Saint-Nicolas, having received news that the French 36-gun frigate L'Inconstante was sailing from Port-au-Prince, escorting a large merchant ship. The next day Penelope met the 32-gun frigate  and the two ships proceeded towards Port-au-Prince. However they learned that L'Inconstante had sailed to Petit Trou with two mail ships, but was soon expected to return to port. They intended to cut her out of the harbour of Port-au-Prince, but on the night of 25 November met her at sea, and after a brisk exchange of broadsides, L'Inconstante surrendered. The Penelope had only one man killed and seven wounded, while the L'Inconstante had nine killed, including the Captain and the First Lieutenant, and 17 wounded. On 2 January 1794 Ford sent Penelope into Port-au-Prince under a flag of truce where Rowley demanded the surrender of the island from the French Civil Commissioner Léger-Félicité Sonthonax. He refused, and the British promptly blockaded the island. After the capture of Port-au-Prince on 4 June 1794, Rowley and Lieutenant-Colonel John Whitelocke were sent back to England with dispatches aboard the sloop .

In August 1794 Rowley was appointed captain of the 74-gun , taking part in the Battle of Hyères Islands on 13 July 1795, off the southern coast of France, when a British fleet under Admiral William Hotham engaged a French fleet. Cumberland was in the van of the British fleet, accepting the surrender of the French 74 , before Hotham ordered the fleet to disengage.

From July 1797 until October 1798 Rowley commanded the 74-gun , capturing the French brig L'Arrogant. Rowley was promoted to Rear-Admiral on 14 February 1799, and to Vice-Admiral on 9 November 1805.

He was appointed Commander-in-Chief at The Downs in 1807 and Commander-in-Chief at the Jamaica Station in 1808, and sailed from England in July 1808 aboard , commanded by Captain William Pryce Cumby. He was promoted to Admiral of the Blue on 31 July 1810, and died at Jamaica on 7 October 1811.

References
Notes

Bibliography
 

|-

1764 births
1811 deaths
People educated at Harrow School
People of the Haitian Revolution
Royal Navy personnel of the American Revolutionary War
Royal Navy personnel of the French Revolutionary Wars
British naval commanders of the Napoleonic Wars
Royal Navy admirals
Younger sons of baronets